M. Jayashree (1921 – 2006), was an Indian actress who worked mainly in Kannada films. She is known for her supporting roles in such movies including Rayara Sose (1957), Naagarahaavu (1972), Eradu Kanasu and Sri Srinivasa Kalyana. 

She was fondly referred to as 'Amma of Silvar screen'. She received Karnataka State Film Award for Best Supporting Actress for her performance in the movie Amara Bharathi in 1970.

Career 
Jayashree was brought to Pakshiraj Studio of Tamil Nadu by Devi, the sister of the studio owner who allowed her to cast in Tamil film Vazhivil Thirunal. Offers were poured in for Jayashree in Tamil movies. This was noticed by Kannada film maker Honnappa Bhagavathar and he made her to debut in Kannada films with the 1948 movie Bhakta Kumbara.

Her next project in Kannada as heroine was Nagakannika in 1949, a blockbuster movie directed by G. Vishwanath. This film considered to be the first Kannada movie based on a folk tale. She played the title role in her next movie Thilotthame in 1951. Gradually she got shifted to supporting roles playing mother, mother-in-law, aunt for stalwarts like Dr. Rajkumar, Kalyan Kumar, Vishnuvardhan, Ambareesh, Tiger Prabhakar, Rajesh, Gangadhar, Srinath and many. In her five decades acting career, Jayashree starred more than 450 films.

Last days and death 
Jayashree did only two movies in the 1990s. Her last released movie was Savira Mettilu, an unfinished film of Puttanna Kanagal and finished by K. S. L. Swamy.

Jayashree spent last years of her life in Sri Vasavi Shantidhama, an old age home in Mysore. She died of heart attack early morning on 29 October 2006.

Awards 
 1970-71 - Karnataka State Film Award for Best Supporting Actress for the film ‛Amara Bharathi’.

Selected filmography

Tamil
 Vizhivil Thirunaal

Telugu
 Manchi Manasuku Manchi Rojulu (1956)

Kannada
 Bhakta Kumbara (1948)
 Nagakannika (1949)
 Thilotthame (1951)
 Jaganmohini (1951)
 Mangala Gowri (1953)
 Muttaide Bhagya (1956)...Gowri
 Rayara Sose (1957)
 Bhakta Kanakadasa (1960)
 Naandi (1964)...Savitri
 Thumbida Koda (1964)...Jaya
 Naagarahaavu (1972)...Sonabai
 Devaru Kotta Thangi (1973)
 Sri Srinivasa Kalyana (1974)
 Aruna Raaga (1986)
 Nammoora Hammera (1990)

See also 
Karnataka State Film Award for Best Supporting Actress

References

External links 

1921 births
2006 deaths
20th-century Indian actresses
People from Mysore
People from Karnataka
21st-century Indian actresses
Actresses in Kannada cinema
Actresses in Tamil cinema
Indian actresses
People from Mysore district
Kannada people